The Gauntlet is a campus publication published by the Gauntlet Publications Society at the University of Calgary. Though commonly referred to as the "University of Calgary's newspaper", it is independent from the University administration and from the Student Union. It has a circulation of 4,000 as well as approximately 50,000 monthly online hits. In 2017, it transitioned from a weekly newspaper to a monthly magazine, but returned to the newspaper format (biweekly) in 2019.

Notable former contributors
Susanne Craig
Zsuzsi Gartner
John Edward Macfarlane

See also
List of student newspapers in Canada
List of newspapers in Canada

References

External links 
 The Gauntlet

Student newspapers published in Alberta
University of Calgary
1960 establishments in Alberta
Newspapers established in 1960